Gallery Whispers is a 1999 detective novel by Quintin Jardine. It is the ninth of the Bob Skinner novels.

1999 British novels
Bob Skinner (book series)
Novels by Quintin Jardine
Hodder & Stoughton books